Curious Volume is the eighth studio album by American doom metal band Pentagram. It was their first studio album to be released on Peaceville Records since 1994's Be Forewarned, and the first album to feature Pete Campbell on drums.

Track listing 
Lay Down and Die – 2:55
The Tempter Push – 4:09
Dead Bury Dead – 4:38
Earth Flight – 2:57
Walk Alone – 3:21
Curious Volume – 4:21
Misunderstood – 3:21
Close the Casket – 4:13
Sufferin' – 3:21
Devil's Playground – 4:38
Because I Made It – 4:24

Lineup 
Bobby Liebling – vocals
Victor Griffin – guitar
Greg Turley – bass
"Minnesota" Pete Campbell – drums

References 

2015 albums
Pentagram (band) albums